The Trofeo Persija or Persija Jakarta Cup is dedicated to celebrating the birth of Persija Jakarta. It is a friendly tournament organised each year by Persija Jakarta at the end of November.

The teams play 3 round-robin 45-minute matches. If any match ends in a draw, it is decided by a penalty shoot-out.  Three points are awarded for a victory during regular play, with no points going to the loser.  If the match is decided by penalties, the winner is awarded 2 points and the loser 1.

Editions

2012 Trofeo Persija

Final Tournament Standings
3 points for win, 0 points for loss
2 points for penalty kick win, 1 point for penalty kick loss
Persija Jakarta wins tournament

Scorers

Matches

Football competitions in Indonesia